Hadiach, sometimes spelled Hadyach, Gadyach, Gadiach, Haditch, or Hadziacz, is a city of regional significance in Poltava Oblast (province) in the central-east part of Ukraine. Located on the Psel River, the city is located in the Myrhorod Raion (district), though administratively it does not belong to the raion. Population:

Overview
Hadiach was granted city rights in 1634. It was a city of Kyiv Voivodeship, Cossack Hetmanate, and Poltava Governorate.

At times of Cossack Hetmanate, Hadiach was a residence of Ukrainian Hetman Ivan Briukhovetsky, election of which saw division of the Hetmanate along the Dnieper river (see The Ruin (Ukrainian history)).

Hadiach is one of the main points of interest to Hasidic Jews visiting Ukraine due to the old cemetery that is on the river running through the city, where Shneur Zalman of Liadi is buried. Until 2020 was a administrative center of Hadyach Raion.

During the 2022 Russian Invasion of Ukraine, there were skirmishes along this town and a Russian tank reportedly was spotted in the Psel River.

Climate

In literature
The main characters in Nikolai Gogol's story Ivan Fyodorovich Shponka and His Aunt are from Hadiach (Gadyach in the 1957 translation by David Magarshack).

Residents
 Mykhailo Drahomanov (1841-1895), political theorist, economist, historian, philosopher, and ethnographer
 Olena Pchilka, mother of Lesya Ukrayinka and a sister of Drahomanov

Gallery

See also
 Treaty of Hadiach
 Hadiach Regiment and Zinkiv Regiment

References

External links
 Unofficial site of Gadyach
 Hadiach in the Encyclopedia of Ukraine
 "Gadyach" (news of Gadyach, events, weather, history. All in English, Ukrainian and Russian language)
 "Gadyach Zemstvo Stamps" - The gallery of local postage stamps of the Gadyach Zemstvo Post Office.

Cities in Poltava Oblast
Cities of district significance in Ukraine
Gadyachsky Uyezd
Kiev Voivodeship
Shneur Zalman of Liadi
Populated places established in 1643
1643 establishments in the Polish–Lithuanian Commonwealth
Cossack Hetmanate